The Polk Hotel (also known as the Palm Crest Hotel or the Landmark Baptist College) is a historic hotel in the Italian Renaissance Revival style. It is located at 800–810 Hinson Avenue in Haines City, Florida.

On March 17, 1994, it was added to the U.S. National Register of Historic Places.

The "Old Polk Hotel", as it is widely known among local residents, is now home to Landmark Baptist College, a ministry of Landmark Baptist Church. It is also the home of WLVF Gospel 90.3 FM, a Gospel/Bluegrass FM radio station, also affiliated with Landmark Baptist Church.

Gallery

References

External links

 Florida's Office of Cultural and Historical Programs
 Polk County listings
 Landmark Baptist College

Buildings and structures in Polk County, Florida
National Register of Historic Places in Polk County, Florida
Italian Renaissance Revival architecture in the United States
Haines City, Florida
Defunct hotels in Florida